"Street Hassle" is a song recorded by American rock musician Lou Reed for his 1978 studio album of the same name. It is 10 minutes and 56 seconds long and divided into three distinct sections: "Waltzing Matilda," "Street Hassle," and "Slipaway." Part one, "Waltzing Matilda," describes a woman picking up and paying a male prostitute. In Part Two, "Street Hassle," a drug dealer speaks at length about the death of a woman in his apartment to her companion. Part Three, "Slipaway," contains a brief, uncredited, spoken word section by Bruce Springsteen (from 9:02 to 9:39) and a dirge sung by Reed about love and death. It was recorded in E major.

On the live album Animal Serenade (2004), Reed says: "I wanted to write a song that had a great monologue set to rock.  Something that could have been written by William Burroughs, Hubert Selby, John Rechy, Tennessee Williams, Nelson Algren, maybe a little Raymond Chandler. You mix it all up and you have 'Street Hassle'."

Critics have described the song as being largely motivated by and representative of the end of Reed's three-year relationship with Rachel Humphreys, a trans woman who died in 1990, likely of AIDS, and was buried on Hart Island in the Bronx in the Potter's Field located on the island. Biographer Anthony DeCurtis summarized the song as "something of a requiem for Reed and Rachel's relationship." (DeCurtis also claimed that the second section of the song, "Street Hassle," was inspired by the mysterious 1975 death of Warhol performer and Max's Kansas City denizen Eric Emerson.) In a 1979 article for Rolling Stone, Mikal Gilmore refers to Rachel as the "raison d'être" for the entire album.

“Street Hassle" was included in 2008's The Pitchfork Media 500: Our Guide to the Greatest Songs from Punk to the Present.

Simple Minds covered the song in an abbreviated version on their sixth studio album Sparkle in the Rain (1984), using two verses (the first and third) from the "Waltzing Matilda" section and a verse from the "Slipaway" section.

In 2005, the song served as the leitmotif for Baker Skateboards' seminal full-length video Baker 3.

References 

1978 songs
Lou Reed songs
Bruce Springsteen songs
LGBT-related songs
Song recordings produced by Steve Lillywhite
Songs about drugs
Songs about streets
Songs written by Lou Reed